Journalism & Communication Monographs is a quarterly peer-reviewed academic journal that covers the fields of journalism and mass communication. The editor-in-chief is Linda Steiner (Philip Merrill College of Journalism, University of Maryland). It was established in 1999 and is currently published by SAGE Publications in association with the Association for Education in Journalism and Mass Communication.

Abstracting and indexing 
Journalism & Communication Monographs is abstracted and indexed in Communication Abstracts.

External links 
 

SAGE Publishing academic journals
English-language journals
Media studies journals
Publications established in 1999
Quarterly journals